Jack Stockwell (born 2 March 1992) is an Australian professional rugby league footballer who plays as a  and  for the Burleigh Bears in the Queensland Cup.

He previously played for the St. George Illawarra Dragons, Newcastle Knights, and Gold Coast Titans in the National Rugby League.

Background
Stockwell was born in Campbelltown, New South Wales, Australia.

He played his junior football for the Picton Magpies, before being signed by the St. George Illawarra Dragons.

Playing career

Early career
From 2009 to 2012, Stockwell played for the St. George Illawarra Dragons' NYC team.

2012
In round 11 of the 2012 NRL season, Stockwell made his NRL debut for St. George against the South Sydney Rabbitohs. 

On 21 April, he played for the New South Wales under-20s team against the Queensland under-20s team in the inaugural under-20s State of Origin match. On 27 June, he played for the New South Wales Residents against the Queensland Residents. On 12 September, he was named at prop in the 2012 New South Wales Cup Team of the Year. On 13 October, he played for the Junior Kangaroos against the Junior Kiwis.

2013
On 20 December, Stockwell re-signed with St. George Illawarra on a four-year contract.

2014
On 31 October, Stockwell signed a three-year contract with the Newcastle Knights starting in 2015, after being released from the final three years of his St. George contract.

2015
In round 1 of the 2015 NRL season, Stockwell made his Knights debut against the New Zealand Warriors. After playing in 12 games for the Knights, he injured his bicep against the Canberra Raiders in round 13, ruling him out for the rest of the season.  Newcastle would finish the 2015 NRL season on the bottom of the table.

2016
Stockwell returned from injury only to play 6 games for the Knights in 2016 under the new coaching of Nathan Brown, spending most of the season in the Intrust Super Premiership NSW.  Newcastle would finish last in both competitions in 2016.

2017
Stockwell was able to work his way back into the NRL team for the beginning of 2017, playing 10 matches before being dropped back to the Intrust Super Premiership NSW.  Newcastle would finish the 2017 NRL season on the bottom of the table for a third year in a row. He left the club at the end of the season after not being offered a new contract beyond 2017. In November, he signed a one-year contract with the Gold Coast Titans starting in 2018.

2018
Stockwell made his debut for the Gold Coast in round 6 of the 2018 NRL season against Penrith at Penrith Park which ended in a 35-12 loss.  Stockwell made a total of 16 appearances for the Gold Coast in 2018 as the club finished in 14th place on the table.

2019
Stockwell made a total of 14 appearances for the Gold Coast in the 2019 NRL season as the club endured a horror year on and off the field.  During the halfway mark of the season, head coach Garth Brennan was sacked by the club after a string of poor results.  The Gold Coast managed to win only 4 games for the entire season and finished last claiming the Wooden Spoon.

2020
On 5 December 2019, after failing to be re-signed by the Titans, it was revealed that Stockwell had signed on with Queensland Cup outfit, the Burleigh Bears, for the 2020 season.

References

External links

Gold Coast Titans profile
Newcastle Knights profile

1992 births
Australian rugby league players
St. George Illawarra Dragons players
Newcastle Knights players
Gold Coast Titans players
Illawarra Cutters players
Junior Kangaroos players
Rugby league props
Rugby league locks
Living people
Rugby league players from Sydney